An extremely powerful extratropical bomb cyclone began in late October 2021 in the Northeast Pacific and struck the Western United States and Western Canada. The storm was the third and the most powerful cyclone in a series of powerful storms that struck the region within a week. The cyclone tapped into a large atmospheric river and underwent explosive intensification, becoming a bomb cyclone on October 24. The system had severe impacts across Western North America, before dissipating on October 26. The storm shattered multiple pressure records across parts of the Pacific Northwest. Additionally, the bomb cyclone was the most powerful storm on record to strike the region, in terms of minimum central pressure. The bomb cyclone brought powerful gale-force winds and flooding to portions of Western North America. At its height, the storm cut the power to over 370,500 customers across the Western U.S. and British Columbia. The storm killed at least two people; damage from the storm was estimated at several hundred million dollars (2021 USD). The bomb cyclone was compared to the Columbus Day Storm of 1962, in terms of ferocity.

Meteorological history

In late October 2021, a Pineapple express, an atmospheric river that often affects Western North America, opened into the Pacific Northwest, channeling a series of three powerful cyclones into the region. Namtheun's remnant brought heavy rain and powerful winds to the Pacific Northwest during this time. Afterward, the system curved northward and then north-northwestward, while gradually weakening, before being absorbed into another approaching extratropical cyclone from the west, late on October 22.

On October 19, a third extratropical cyclone developed over the Northwest Pacific, over the Sea of Japan. Over the next several days, the system quickly moved eastward across the North Pacific, moving into the Northeast Pacific on October 23. Soon afterward, the system began to quickly intensify while slowing down, though at 00:00 UTC on October 24, the cyclone underwent a center relocation, with the storm's center shifting slightly eastward. A "bomb cyclone" is a powerful cyclone that undergoes extreme intensification, with the central pressure dropping at least  within a 24-hour period. Around this time, the system's rainbands began moving ashore in Western North America, bringing severe impacts to the region. The system ended up triggering a Category 5 Atmospheric River event, the highest rating on a scale devised by the Scripps Institute of Oceanography in 2019 for ranking the severity of atmospheric river storms, from 1 to 5. Afterward, the cyclone gradually weakened as it slowly moved towards the coast of British Columbia, with a new low developing over California, as the eastern portion of the system broke off and became a new storm. Early on October 26, the cyclone rapidly weakened while making landfall in British Columbia, before being absorbed into a larger approaching extratropical cyclone to the west, several hours later, at 09:00 UTC that day. However, the new storm that broke off from the bomb cyclone continued moving eastward across the United States for the next several days, before developing into a powerful cyclone that struck the Eastern United States around the Halloween weekend, producing  of rain in Baltimore.

Preparation, impact, and records
In anticipation of the storm's impacts, the National Weather Service (NWS) issued Flash flood watches and warnings across portions of Central California, including the San Francisco Bay Area. The NWS also issued a winter storm warning for parts of the Sierra Nevada through October 26. The NWS issued evacuation orders for residents around the Santa Cruz Mountains, due to concerns of debris flows from the burn scar of the CZU Lightning Complex fires in 2020. They also warned residents near the burn scars around Sacramento to be ready to evacuate, and to take shelter in the highest part of their homes if they were unable to evacuate in the event of an evacuation order. In San Francisco, city authorities sent text alerts to residents, warning them of flooded streets and downed trees and power lines. All of downtown San Rafael was closed to non-essential traffic, as the roads flooded.

The hardest-hit areas were in Northern and Central California, and in southern Oregon. In Central California, the bomb cyclone brought several inches of rain to multiple regions, ending a 212-day streak with no measurable precipitation in the region and also effectively ending the state's wildfire season that year. The storm channeled an atmospheric river into Central California and moved slower than expected, triggering flooding across the Bay Area and flooding multiple highways. Downtown San Francisco recorded  of rain on October 24, making it the wettest October day recorded in the city's history. On October 24, Blue Canyon recorded  of rain, and Santa Rosa recorded  of rain; these measurements broke the records for the single-wettest day recorded in both areas. The storm dumped over a few feet of snow across the Sierra Nevada. Rainfall from the storm resulted in flash flooding and mudslides in areas with wildfire burn scars, including a landslide that forced the closure of SR 70 in both directions. In Placer County, I-80 was closed in both directions. In San Rafael, many roads were submerged under  of water, and in some parts of the city, the water level reached waist-height; and there were over 330 calls for firefighter or police assistance, which was four times the average amount. Multiple reservoirs experienced a significant increase in their water levels during the storm. A tornado warning was also issued for the area just west of Wasco, on the afternoon of October 25, marking the first tornado warning issued in the San Joaquin Valley in 592 days. However, no tornadoes touch downs were confirmed from the storm. In California, over 160,000 homes and businesses lost power. The storm and its intensity was linked to climate change, with some scientists predicting that a warmer climate would likely make such powerful storms more frequent, along with more severe droughts. This helped give California their 4th wettest October on record.

In Reno, Nevada,  of rain was recorded, from October 24–25, just short of the October daily record of  set in 2010. This helped give Nevada their 5th wettest October on record.

The storm brought heavy rain, thunderstorms, and powerful winds to Oregon. Multiple downed trees were reported in the Portland metropolitan area, and a small outdoor greenhouse was destroyed in Eastwood Elementary School, in Hillsboro. Winds from the storm cut the power to over 28,000 customers in the state.

In Washington state, powerful winds from the bomb cyclone toppled a tree onto a car, killing a mother and her son inside. Amtrak's Coast Starlight train was stuck south of Kelso, due to downed trees blocking the tracks. Winds from the storm gusting up to  resulted in power outages for over 170,000 customers, around the Seattle metropolitan area and around Puget Sound. The highest winds recorded in Washington state were  gusts on the Long Beach Peninsula.

The storm also generated -waves off the coast of the Pacific Northwest.

In British Columbia, winds from the storm cut the power to over 12,500 customers, including 5,500 customers on Vancouver Island. Ferry trips were also cancelled, due to the bad weather. The storm prevented firefighters from dealing with the chemical fire until after the passage of the storm.

The bomb cyclone was considered the most powerful storm to strike the Western United States in 26 years, in addition to being the most intense storm recorded in the Northeast Pacific. The cyclone was estimated to have caused at least several hundred million dollars in damages, on the U.S. West Coast. The bomb cyclone was compared to the Columbus Day Storm of 1962, in terms of ferocity and impacts. While both systems were powerful cyclones that had severe effects on the Pacific Northwest, the October 2021 cyclone was the more intense system of the two, but the Columbus Day Storm tracked closer to the coast than the later storm did, which made the former more severe than the latter.

See also

 Great Gale of 1880
 Columbus Day Storm of 1962
 January 2008 North American storm complex
 January 2010 North American winter storms
 October 2010 North American storm complex
 December 2010 North American blizzard
 November 2011 Bering Sea cyclone
 January 2013 Northwest Pacific cyclone
 March 2014 North American winter storm
 November 2014 Bering Sea cyclone
 2017 California floods
 January 31 – February 3, 2021 nor'easter – Another powerful cyclone that struck the West Coast of the U.S. and triggered extensive atmospheric river flooding there, before later striking the East Coast
 Pacific Northwest windstorm

References

External links

 Wolf Read: The Storm King- Some Historical Weather Events in the Pacific Northwest
 NEW SCALE TO CHARACTERIZE STRENGTH AND IMPACTS OF ATMOSPHERIC RIVER STORMS
 Cat 1 to Cat 5: A Scale for Atmospheric Rivers

2021 meteorology
2021 natural disasters in the United States
2021 in California
2021 in Oregon
2021 in Washington (state)
2021 in Canada
October 2021 events in North America
Pacific Northwest storms
2021–22 North American winter